The president of Puntland is the head of government of the Puntland State of Somalia. The president represents the government of Puntland. The office of president of Puntland was established with the proclamation of the Puntland State of Somalia on 1 August 1998. The first president of Puntland was Abdullahi Yusuf Ahmed. The current office-holder is the sixth president Said Abdullahi Dani, since 8 January 2019.

List
In 2001, the first president, Abdullahi Yusuf Ahmed, whose term was expiring, was ousted from the capital by the opposition for refusing to step down. The opposition held a shir (council) in November and elected Jama Ali Jama as president. Therefore, Jama Ali Jama is sometimes considered the second president of Puntland.

However, Abdullahi Yusuf Ahmed formed an army and, with Ethiopian support, expelled Jama Ali Jama from the capital in early 2002. Therefore, today, Somali media usually don't count Jama Ali Jama a Puntland president, and  report Mohamed Abdi Hashi as the second president.

Therefore, Abdirahman Farole is the "fourth president," according to a document issued in 2018 by the Puntland Bureau of Statistics. And the current president of Puntland, Said Deni, writes in his Facebook page, "The 6th and Current President Of the Puntland State of Somalia."

See also
List of presidents of Somaliland
Lists of office-holders

References

External links
World Statesmen – Somalia (Puntland)

Puntland
Somalia history-related lists
Government of Somalia